is a Japanese fantasy manga series by Yako Gureishi. It was serialized online from April 2015 to October 2019 via Tokuma Shoten's online manga magazine Web Comic Zenyon. It was collected in six tankōbon volumes. An anime television series adaptation produced by Satelight and Hornets ran from January 9 to March 26, 2020. Crunchyroll co-produced the series.

After a long hiatus, the manga officially ended on December 22, 2020 due to the author Yako Gureishi's health problems.

Plot
The world is ruled by spirits, goblins, and all manner of strange creatures. Human beings are persecuted, to the very point of extinction. One day, a golem and a lone human girl meet. This is a record of the pair, one a member of a ruined race, the other a watchman of the forest. It tells of their travels together and of the bond between father and daughter, but the golem can only live for another year or so, he must find other humans in order to get her with her own race before he dies.

Characters

A young human girl who is found by Golem in his forest. She has endless curiosity, which usually gets her in trouble. She wears a hood on her head with minotaur horns to hide her human features since humans are a delicacy in the monster world.

An ancient automaton protector of the forest who stumbles upon Somali while patrolling the woods. He exhibits no emotions, but instinctively protects Somali from any potential threat. He acts like Somali's father and she calls him "Dad".

 A dwarf oni and an herbalist. He uses herbs to create medicine and lives in a cabin in the woods. He took care of Somali when she injured her knee while playing.

 Shizuno's assistant who lives with Shizuno in the forest cabin. He is also an oni and the caretaker of Shizuno's abode.

 A young woolly shurigara boy. He is reluctant to work at his father's diner when his mother gets injured. He befriends Somali, though is wary of her love of cuddling furry animals.

 A woolly shurigara and Kikila's father. He owns a slightly rundown diner in Anthole City and hires Golem as a waiter when his wife Giina injures her back while working.

 The guardian of Anthole City's sacred cavern and Kikila's teacher. He saves both Somali and Kikila from a beast when they go delving into the underground area without permission.

 A harpy and Haitora's travel companion. She loves Haitora and is willing to do anything to cure his condition, going so far as to kill another human to do it.

 A human disguised as a falcohol and Uzoi's travel companion. Ailing with a medical condition that's painfully turning him into a harpy after he and his family's ate Uzoi's mother,, he attempts to stop Uzoi from hurting others for his benefit.

 A witch who works at the Witches' Crest Library and Praline's younger sister. She aids Golem and Somali as they research the whereabouts and knowledge of humans.

 A witch at the Witches' Crest Library and Hazel's older sister, she lives in an underground bunker beneath the library and occasionally steals books to read for herself.

 The multi-armed lizard-like innkeeper of the inn used by the group in Bygone City. While she is initially helpful and sweet, when she finds out Somali is human, she betrays the group and gossips about it to others.

Media

Manga

Anime
An anime television series adaptation was announced on March 22, 2019. The series was originally scheduled to premiere in October 2019, but the premiere date was pushed back to January 2020. The series was co-animated by Satelight and Hornets, with Kenji Yasuda directing the series and Ikuko Itoh designing the characters. Mariko Mochizuki handled the series composition, while Ryo Yoshimata composed the series' music. It aired from January 9 to March 26, 2020 on AbemaTV, Tokyo MX, and BS-NTV and ran for 12 episodes. Naotarō Moriyama performed the series' opening theme song "Arigatō wa Kocchi no Kotoba," while Inori Minase performed the series' ending theme song "Kokoro Somali." Crunchyroll debuted the first episode on January 2, 2020, a week before its Japan airing. On May 18, 2021, it was announced that Sentai Filmworks picked up the home video rights.

Notes

References

External links
  
 

2020 anime television series debuts
Anime series based on manga
Fantasy anime and manga
Japanese webcomics
Satelight
Seinen manga
Sentai Filmworks
Tokuma Shoten manga
Tokyo MX original programming
Webcomics in print